The Cabinet of Queensland is the chief policy-making group of people within the Government of Queensland in Australia.

Composition
The Cabinet has the same membership as the Executive Council: the Premier and ministers (including the Deputy Premier and Attorney-General). Assistant ministers, formerly called parliamentary secretaries, are not members.

Current members

On 12 November 2020, Premier Palaszczuk announced a new line up for the ministry.

Role
Unlike the Executive Council, which is a mechanism for advising the Governor, the Cabinet meets without the Governor and is responsible for formulating and coordinating policy. In effect, the Executive Council is a vehicle for implementing decisions made in Cabinet. Individual ministers are collectively responsible for the decisions made by Cabinet, so ministers are expected to resign if unwilling to publicly support a collective decision of Cabinet.

Meetings
Meetings of the Cabinet are usually held on 10:00 a.m. on Mondays in the Executive Building's Cabinet Room. The Premier (or Deputy Premier in her or his absence) chairs its meetings and establishes its agenda. All members are expected to be present at all meetings unless excused by the Premier.

See also
 Cabinet of Australia
 Government of Queensland
 First Palaszczuk Ministry
 Second Palaszczuk Ministry

Notes

References

External links
 Cabinet Handbook

Government of Queensland